Robert Anderson Harris (March 16, 1927 – April 10, 1977) was a National Basketball Association (NBA) player. In his senior season at Oklahoma State University, Harris was selected to the NCAA AP All-American second team. Harris was drafted with the third overall pick in the 1949 BAA Draft by the Fort Wayne Pistons. On December 19, 1950 Harris was traded to the Boston Celtics for Dick Mehen. On October 16, 1954 Harris was traded back to the Pistons for Fred Scolari, but he never had any play time for the remainder of games for the Pistons. In his NBA career, Harris averaged 6.8 points and 6.9 rebounds per game.

References

External links
Cowboy Basketball All-Americans

1927 births
1977 deaths
All-American college men's basketball players
American men's basketball players
Basketball players from Tennessee
Boston Celtics players
Fort Wayne Pistons draft picks
Fort Wayne Pistons players
Forwards (basketball)
Junior college men's basketball players in the United States 
Oklahoma State Cowboys basketball players
People from Perry County, Tennessee